Epichloë chisosa is a hybrid asexual species in the fungal genus Epichloë. 

A systemic and seed-transmissible grass symbiont first described in 1996,  Epichloë chisosa is a natural triploid allopolyploid of Epichloë amarillans, Epichloë bromicola and a strain in the Epichloë typhina complex (from Poa pratensis).

Epichloë chisosa is found in North America, where it has been identified in the grass species Achnatherum eminens.

References

chisosa
Fungi described in 1996
Fungi of North America